The D.A.'s Man is an American television crime drama, produced by Jack Webb, that aired on NBC from January 3, 1959, to August 29, 1959.

The central character, who went by the single name Shannon, was a private detective who worked for the Manhattan district attorney. 

The program was based on the book The D.A.'s Man by Harold Danforth and James B. Horan, an autobiographical account of Danforth's law enforcement career, which won the Edgar Award for Best Fact-Crime Book awarded by the Mystery Writers of America. When the TV series based on the book aired, Danforth served as the program's police technical advisor, while Horan served as an associate producer and also contributed several scripts to the series.

Liggett & Myers, for Chesterfield King and L&M cigarettes, sponsored the program. George Stevens Jr. and Webb were among the directors.

Cast
John Compton as Shannon
Ralph Manza as Al Bonscarsi
Herb Ellis as Frank La Valle

Episode list

References

External links
 

NBC original programming
1959 American television series debuts
1959 American television series endings
1950s American crime drama television series
Television shows set in New York City
Black-and-white American television shows
Television series by Mark VII Limited
Television series about prosecutors